The Social Democratic Party of Lithuania (LSDP) is a centre-left and social democratic political party in Lithuania. Founded as an underground Marxist organization in 1896, it is the oldest extant party in Lithuania. During the time of the Soviet Union, the party went into exile, emerging once again in Lithuania in 1989.

The party led a government in the unicameral Seimas, Lithuania's parliament from 2001 to 2008 and from 2012 to 2016. The party is a member of the Party of European Socialists (PES), the Progressive Alliance, and the Socialist International.

History

Establishment

Initial discussions about forming a Marxist political party in Lithuania began early in 1895, with a number of informal gatherings bringing together social democrats of various stripes resulting in a preparatory conference in the summer of that year. Differences in objectives became clear between ethnic Jews and ethnic Lithuanians and Poles, with the former seeing themselves essentially as Russian Marxists while the latter two groups harbored both revolutionary and national aspirations. Moreover, the ethnic Poles and Lithuanians saw themselves divided over the question of alliance with non-Marxist liberals. As a result, not one but three Marxist political organizations would emerge in Lithuania between 1895 and 1897.

The Social Democratic Party of Lithuania (LSDP) was founded on 1 May (19 April O.S.) 1896 at a secret congress held in an apartment in Vilnius. Among the 13 delegates were Andrius Domaševičius and Alfonsas Moravskis — a pair of intellectuals regarded as the central organizers of the new political entity — and the future President of Lithuania, Kazys Grinius, as well as a number of worker activists. Also in attendance as a representative of the radical youth movement was an 18-year-old ethnic Pole named Felix Dzerzhinsky, later the head of the Soviet secret police. As Lithuania was then part of the Russian Empire, the LSDP was inevitably an illegal organization, meeting in secret and seeking to bring about the revolutionary overthrow of the Tsarist regime.

The LSDP was a dual language organization, publishing its illegal newspapers both in Lithuanian and Polish. Newspapers were published abroad, printed in East Prussia (or sometimes Switzerland or France) and smuggled across the border. Technical assistance was occasionally provided by the Social Democratic Party of the Kingdom of Poland and Lithuania, headed by Julian Marchlewski.

This smuggling of Lithuanian newspapers had historical antecedents. Following the Polish and Lithuanian Uprising of 1863, the Tsarist regime had banned publication of all newspapers which used the Latin alphabet, a measure which amounted to a de facto ban of the entire Lithuanian press. This proscription extended for the rest of the 19th Century; in 1898 of 18 newspapers appearing in Lithuanian, 11 were published by Lithuanians in emigration in America and the other 7 were published in East Prussia.

The LSDP was very nearly obliterated at birth by the Tsarist secret police, which over the course of 1897 to 1899 managed to arrest a number of the party's leading activists. Approximately 280 socialist and trade union organizers were apprehended during this period, with subsequent trials leading to the Siberian exile of more than 40 people, including Domaševičius and Dzerzhinsky. Other top leaders, including Moravskis, were forced to flee the country to avoid being swept up in the Okhrana's dragnet. With the party leadership jailed or chased from the country, the LSDP very nearly ceased to exist as the 19th Century drew to a close.

Resurgence

From 1900 to 1902 the Social Democratic Party of Lithuania began to tentatively rise from the ashes behind a new crop of young revolutionaries. Chief among these were a pair of Lithuanian students in Vilnius, Vladas Sirutavičius and Steponas Kairys.

It was the first Lithuanian political party and one of the major parties who initiated the assembly called Great Seimas of Vilnius in 1905. The party was one of the major political powers during the Lithuanian independence period between 1918 and 1940. Following the election of 1926, the party formed a left-wing coalition government with Lithuanian Peasant Popular Union. This government was dismissed after the 1926 Lithuanian coup d'état. The authoritarian regime of Antanas Smetona banned all political parties in 1936.

Period of Soviet occupation

During the Soviet occupation era, no democratically constituted political parties existed within Lithuania. Therefore, between 1945 and the 1989 restoration of independence, the party was assembled and worked covertly in exile.

1989–2001

In 1989, the Social Democratic Party of Lithuania was restored and Kazimieras Antanavičius was elected to be party's leader. The party had 9 seats in the Supreme Council – Reconstituent Seimas and was not successful in substantially increasing the number in the following elections, with 8 seats won in 1992 and 12 in 1996.

In 1999, the party's congress elected a new leader, Vytenis Andriukaitis and merger negotiations with the Democratic Labour Party of Lithuania (LDDP)–the bulk of the former Communist Party of Lithuania (which had broken away from Moscow in 1989) began. Members of the party opposing the merger left to establish "Social democracy 2000" (later renamed "Social Democratic Union of Lithuania"). The SDPL-LDDP coalition won 51 of the 141 seats in the elections in 2000 (with 19 going to the Social Democrats). However, despite success in the elections, the coalition parties had to settle for a place in the opposition until 2001, when the collapse of the ruling coalition between Liberals and New Union allowed ex-President Algirdas Brazauskas to form a government with New Union.

Merge with the Democratic Labour Party of Lithuania 

In 2001, the Social Democratic Party of Lithuania and the Democratic Labour Party of Lithuania merged. The merged party kept the Social Democratic name, but was dominated by former Democratic Labour Party members (ex-Communists). After the merger, Algirdas Brazauskas was elected leader of the Social Democratic Party.

By the beginning of 2004 negotiations between the Social Democratic Party of Lithuania and various other parties to form electoral coalition. They managed to form electoral coalition called "Working for Lithuania" with their coalition partners, New Union. At the 2004 legislative elections, the Social Democratic Party of Lithuania won 20 of the 141 seats in the Seimas (other 11 seats were won by the New Union), but managed to stay at the helm of successive coalition governments, including the minority government between 2006 and 2008. During the minority government, party's parliamentary group became the largest one in parliament, mainly due to defections from the Labour Party and the New Union (Social Liberals).

Brazauskas resigned as the chairman of the party on 19 May 2007 and was replaced by Gediminas Kirkilas.

At the 2008 elections the party won 11.73% of the national vote and 25 seats in the Seimas, five more than in the previous elections. However, its coalition partners, the Labour Party, the New Union (Social Liberals) and the Lithuanian Peasants Popular Union, fared poorly and the party ended up in opposition to the Homeland Union-led government.

On 7 March 2009 the party's congress elected a new leader, Algirdas Butkevičius. He was the party's candidate at the 2009 Lithuanian presidential election, coming in second place with 11.83% of the vote.

At the 2012 parliamentary elections, the party took 38 seats and became the largest party in Parliament (although it lost in popular vote). Butkevičius became the prime minister, forming a coalition government with the Labour Party, Order and Justice and Electoral Action of Poles in Lithuania. At the 2016 parliamentary elections, the party took 21 seats and formed a coalition with Lithuanian Farmers and Greens Union.

In 2017, the Social Democratic Party withdraw from coalition. In 2018, some party members left and formed the Social Democratic Labour Party of Lithuania. After this split, the party lost a lot of support, but in 2019 it partly recovered.

At the 2020 parliamentary elections, the party achieved results, which were worse than expected. Due to this, Gintautas Paluckas received criticism from party's board and resigned in 2021.

After following leadership election, Vilija Blinkevičiūtė (between 2002 and 2006 she was New Union (Social Liberals) member) was elected as the new leader.

Popular support

In early 1990s the party had between 3 and 5 per cent support nationally. It got most support from areas with light industry (e. g. Marijampolė, Vilkaviškis, Miksulėnai). By the end of decade, LSDP increased their support in Radviliškis district (probably, at expense of Democratic Labour Party of Lithuania (LDDP)).

After merger of these two parties, LSDP gained support from most supporters of LDDP. In early 2010s, the party lost support due to deindustrialisation, rise of public election committees and Lithuanian Farmers and Greens Union (e. g. in Kaunas by 2011 got over 12 per cent of votes, but in 2019 the party received just over 3 per cent of the votes).

Electoral results

Seimas

European Parliament

Members of the parliament
Social Democratic Party of Lithuania won 17 seats in the 2016 election, but the party split in October, 2017. 9 members of the party were subsequently removed from the party.

Leaders
Aloyzas Sakalas (14 January 1991 – 15 June 1999)
Vytenis Andriukaitis (15 June 1999 – 15 May 2001)
Algirdas Brazauskas (15 May 2001 – 29 June 2007)
Gediminas Kirkilas (29 June 2007 – 12 May 2009)
Algirdas Butkevičius (12 May 2009 – 8 May 2017)
Gintautas Paluckas (8 May 2017 – 22 January 2021)
Vilija Blinkevičiūtė (29 May 2021 – present)

References

Further reading
 Diana Janušauskienė, "Youth Political Organizations in Lithuania," Polish Sociological Review, no. 139 (2002), pp. 337–356. In JSTOR
 Vladas Krivickas, "The Programs of the Lithuanian Social Democratic Party, 1896-1931," Journal of Baltic Studies, no. 2 (1980), pp. 99–111.
 Vladimir Levin, "Lithuanians in Jewish Politics of the Late Imperial Period," in Vladas Sirutavičius and Darius Staliūnas (eds.), A Pragmatic Alliance: Jewish-Lithuanian Political Cooperation at the Beginning of the 20th Century. Budapest: Central European University Press, 2011; pp. 77–118.
 Ezra Mendelsohn, Class Struggle in the Pale: The Formative Years of the Jewish Workers' Movement in Tsarist Russia. Cambridge, England: Cambridge University Press, 1970.
 Toivo U. Raun, "The Revolution of 1905 in the Baltic Provinces and Finland," Slavic Review, no. 3 (1984), pp. 453–467.
 Leonas Sabaliūnas, Lithuanian Social Democracy in Perspective. Durham, NC: Duke University Press, 1990.
 Leonas Sabaliūnas, "Social Democracy in Tsarist Lithuania, 1893-1904," Slavic Review, vol. 31, no. 2 (June 1972), pp. 323–342. In JSTOR
 James D. White, "National Communism and World Revolution: The Political Consequences of German Military Withdrawal from the Baltic Area in 1918-19," Europe-Asia Studies, vol. 46, no. 8 (1994), pp. 1349– 1369. In JSTOR
 James D. White, "The Revolution in Lithuania 1918-19," Soviet Studies, vol. 23, no. 2 (Oct. 1971), pp. 186–200. In JSTOR

External links
  

Political parties established in 1896
1896 establishments in the Russian Empire
Social democratic parties
Socialist parties in Lithuania
Full member parties of the Socialist International
Progressive Alliance
Party of European Socialists member parties
Organizations based in Vilnius
Pro-European political parties in Lithuania